Scopula carnosa is a moth of the family Geometridae. It was described by Prout in 1925. It is endemic to South Africa.

References

Moths described in 1925
carnosa
Endemic moths of South Africa
Taxa named by Louis Beethoven Prout